There are over 20,000 Grade II* listed buildings in England. This page is a list of these buildings in the district of North Lincolnshire in Lincolnshire.

North Lincolnshire

|}

Notes

External links

 
Lists of Grade II* listed buildings in Lincolnshire
 
Borough of North Lincolnshire